Templar Poetry is an independent publisher of poetry that is based in Derbyshire, England. Templar publishes around 15 new print titles each year. The Templar Poetry periodical iOTA includes new poetry from open submissions, commissioned work, reviews, and features on poetry and related themes and issues.

Founded on the island of Bute, Scotland in 2005, Templar Poetry is composed of practitioners drawn from literature, art, the music industry, design and the broadcast and print media. The goal is to publish excellent quality poetry for a wide audience. Templar Poetry is committed to  transmitting poetry in oral and textual formats, and in developing cross genre partnerships.

Templar has published over one 100 titles - poetry pamphlets, collections, anthologies, monographs and poetic biographies. Many Templar poets feature in major poetry competition prize lists and several have their work read and studied in primary, secondary and tertiary education. Templar titles have been recognized by The Forward Foundation, The Poetry Trust, The Poetry Book Society and The Michael Marks Charitable Trust.

Templar has been recognized for the quality and aesthetics of its book design and production in the British Book Design and Production Awards administered by the BPIF (British Print Industry Federation).

The press also publishes Iota Poetry, a printed quarterly magazine.

Templar administers a range of publishing awards each year open to both new and established poets writing in English anywhere in the world.

Templar Poetry is a Not for Profit organization.  Using grants from Arts Council England, Templar has developed an archive of recorded work, established the Derwent Poetry Festival in Derbyshire and conducted  regular Templar Poetry Live readings at Keats House in London and other venues.

References

External links
Templar Poetry Website

Publishing companies of the United Kingdom
Poetry publishers